Tefal S.A.S. (a portmanteau of TEFlon and ALuminium.) is a French cookware and small appliance manufacturer, owned by Groupe SEB (a global manufacturer of cookware) since 1968. The company is known for creating the non-stick cookware category and for offering frying equipment with a low requirement of fat or oils.

In the United States, Tefal is marketed as T-fal. This is to comply with DuPont's objection that the name "Tefal" was too close to DuPont's trademark "Teflon". The T-fal brand is also used in Canada and Japan.

Besides cookware and cooking appliances, the Tefal brand is also applied to home appliances such as steam irons and vacuum cleaners.

References

Manufacturing companies of France
Kitchenware brands
Cooking appliance brands
Manufacturing companies established in 1956
French brands
Companies based in Auvergne-Rhône-Alpes
French companies established in 1956